
Gruber is a German surname from Austria and Bavaria, referring to a person from a geological depression, mine, or pit. It is the most common surname in Austria (see List of most common surnames).

Places
 Gruber Mountains, Antarctica
 Gruber, Manitoba, former settlement in the Canadian province of Manitoba
 Camp Gruber, Oklahoma Army National Guard facility, named for Edmund L. Gruber

People

People whose family name is or was Gruber
 Andreas Gruber (born 1954), Austrian screenwriter and director
Amy Gruber, (born 1987) all round legend
 Barbara Gruber (born 1977), German ski mountaineer
 Christoph Gruber (born 1976), Austrian alpine skier
 David Gruber, American Marine Biologist
Edita Gruber
Slovak opera singer
 Edmund L. Gruber (1879–1941) US Army general, composer of military music, and brother of William R. Gruber
 Ferry Gruber (1926–2004), Austrian-German tenor in opera and operetta
 Florian Gruber (born 1983), German racing driver
 Frank Gruber (writer) (1904–1969), writer of Westerns and detective fiction
 Franz Gruber (actor) (born 1930), actor, played in the Japanese Tokusatsu movie/TV productions 
 Franz Gruber (musician) (1787–1863), Austrian teacher, composer of "Silent Night" 
 Gabriel Gruber (1740–1805), Viennese Jesuit, architect and hydraulics expert
 Gary Gruber, (1940-2019) scientist, educator, author
 Gerhard Gruber (born 1951), Austrian pianist
 Hans Gruber (conductor) (1925–2001), Canadian conductor
 Hans Gruber (footballer) (1905–1967), German footballer
 Heinz Karl Gruber (born 1943) Austrian composer (a descendant of Franz Xavier)
 Howard Gruber (1922–2005), professor of psychology of creativity
 Lucy Gruber (Born 1998), British ice hockey player / goalie 
 Jeremy Gruber (born 1971), Jewish-American civil rights activist
Johann Gottfried Gruber (1774–1851), German literary historian and critic
 John Gruber (born 1973), blogger (Daring Fireball)
 Jonathan Gruber (born 1965), American economist
Jordan Gruber (born 1983), American-Israeli soccer player
 Karl Gruber (1909–1995), foreign minister of Austria from 1945 to 1953
 Kelly Gruber (born 1962), U.S. Major League Baseball player
 Lilli Gruber (born 1957), Italian television journalist and politician
 Malvina Gruber (born 1900), Czech Jewish Comintern agent 
 Martin Gruber (born 1975), an Italian luger
 Michael Gruber (actor) (born 1964), American actor
 Michael Gruber (author) (born 1940), American novelist
 Munyo (Samuel) Gruber (born 1913), Jewish resistance fighter
 Patrick Gruber (born 1978), Italian luger
 Paul Gruber (born 1965), professional football player for the Tampa Bay Buccaneers (1988–1999)
 Rony Gruber (born 1963), movie director and scriptwriter.
 Ruth Gruber (1911–2016), Jewish-American journalist and author of "I visited the Soviet Arctic"
 Samuel D. Gruber, (born 1956) American architecture historian, specialist on Jewish sites
 Samuel H. Gruber, (1938-2019) shark biologist
 Scarlet Gruber (born 1989), Venezuelan actress
 Stefan Gruber (born 1975), performance artist, animator and educator
 Theodor Gruber, Austrian chess player
 Tom Gruber (born 1959), American computer scientist, inventor, and entrepreneur
 William Gruber, inventor of the View-Master stereoscopic system
 Juan Manuel G. Grüber (1904–1997), Venezuelan economist, financier, writer, philosopher and diplomat.
 William H. Gruber (born 1935), American organizational theorist
 William R. Gruber (1890–1979), United States Army brigadier general and brother of Edmund L. Gruber

People nicknamed Gruber
(See also the longer list at de:wiki)
 Dave "Gruber" Allen (born 1958), American comedian and actor

Fictional entities
 Hans Gruber, a fictional character and the main antagonist in the film Die Hard (1988), portrayed by Alan Rickman
 Lieutenant Hubert Gruber, a fictional character from the British sitcom 'Allo 'Allo!
 Lester Gruber, a fictional torpedoman's mate on the American television series McHale's Navy
 Mr. Gruber, a recurring character in the Paddington Bear series
 Gruber, Gaster's villainous sidekick in PaRappa the Rapper anime
 Simon Gruber, a fictional character and the main antagonist in the film Die Hard with a Vengeance (1995), portrayed by Jeremy Irons
 Rolf Gruber, a fictional character in the film The Sound of Music (1965)
 Hauptmann Fritz Gruber is a fictional character who appeared in the 1960s sitcom Hogan's Heroes. He was played by Dick Wilson.
 Hans Gruber, a character from the movie Re-Animator

Other uses
 Gruber–De Gasperi Agreement (aka the Treaty of Gruber-De Gasperi), named after the Italian Alcide De Gasperi and Austrian Minister of Foreign Affairs Karl Gruber

See also
 list of German articles on people named Grüber 
Surnames of South Tyrolean origin

Surnames of Austrian origin

References

German-language surnames